Sallee or Sallée is a French surname, a variation of sallé (salted or salty). Notable people with the surname include:

Brady Sallee, American women's college basketball coach
Charles L. Sallée Jr (1913–2006), African-American artist from Cleveland, Ohio
LaVonne Salleé (born 1946), American artist
Mary Lou Sallee (1930–2018), American Republican politician
Ralph W. Sallee (1927–2022), American meteorologist
Slim Sallee (1885–1950), American baseball pitcher

See also
 Salle (disambiguation)

French-language surnames